Limnaecia chloronephes is a moth in the family Cosmopterigidae. It is found in Zimbabwe.

References

Natural History Museum Lepidoptera generic names catalog

Limnaecia
Moths described in 1924
Moths of Africa
Taxa named by Edward Meyrick